"I Don't Mind" is a song by American singer Usher, featuring American rapper Juicy J. It was released on November 21, 2014, through RCA Records, as the intended lead single from his then-upcoming eighth studio album, Hard II Love. The song's lyrics concern being involved with a stripper, and not being bothered by her line of work.

The song peaked at number 11 on the Billboard Hot 100 and topped the Billboard Hot R&B/Hip Hop Songs chart, becoming his thirteenth number-one single on the chart and tying him with Michael Jackson and Marvin Gaye for sixth place among artists with the most number ones on the chart. Internationally, "I Don't Mind" has peaked within the top ten of the charts in the United Kingdom.

Background
An unfinished version of the track surfaced on June 24, 2014 online to good reception. Usher posted the song to his official SoundCloud account on October 2, 2014, confirming it to be the next official single from his then titled album Flawed.

Track listing

Charts

Weekly charts

Year-end charts

Certifications

Release history

References

External links
Full lyrics at LyricsOnDemand.com 

Usher (musician) songs
Juicy J songs
2014 singles
2014 songs
Songs written by Usher (musician)
Songs written by Juicy J
RCA Records singles
Songs written by Theron Thomas
Songs written by Timothy Thomas
Songs written by Jacob Kasher
Songs written by Dr. Luke